Penrhiwceiber Rangers F.C (Welsh: Clwb Pêldroed Penrhiwceibr Rangers) are a football team from Glasbrook Terrace Penrhiwceiber who play in the Ardal Leagues South West. The club were formed in 1961.

Honours
South Wales Amateur League Winners: 1991–92
Corinthian Cup Winners: 1991–92
Welsh League Division Three Champions: 1993–94
Welsh League Division Two Champions: 1994–95
Welsh League Division Two Champions: 1998–99
Welsh League Division Two Champions: 2009–10
 Welsh League Division Two Champions:' 2019-20

External links
Official website

Football clubs in Wales
Association football clubs established in 1961
1961 establishments in Wales
Welsh Football League clubs
Ardal Leagues clubs